Paolo Pizzo (born 4 April 1983) is an Italian right-handed épée fencer, two-time individual world champion, two-time Olympian, and 2016 team Olympic silver medalist.

Biography
In 1996, when Paolo Pizzo was 13, he was diagnosed with head cancer that forced him to abandon the sport, then came slow rehabilitation until his first victory came in 2009.

Pizzo competed in the 2012 London Olympic Games and the 2016 Rio de Janeiro Olympic Games, where he won a silver medal in the team men's épée event.

Pizzo won a gold medal in the individual men's épée event at the 2011 World Fencing Championships in Catania, Italy, and a gold medal in the individual men's épée event at the 2017 World Fencing Championships in Leipzig, Germany.

Pizzo won a silver medal in the individual men's épée event at the 2014 European Fencing Championships in Strasbourg, France; a silver medal in the team men's épée event at the 2016 European Fencing Championships in Toruń, Poland; and a silver medal in the individual men's épée event at the 2017 European Fencing Championships in Tbilisi, Georgia.

Between 2009 and 2017, Pizzo won one silver medal and three bronze medals at FIE Men's Épée Grands Prix.

Between 2009 and 2015, Pizzo won two silver medals and five bronze medals at FIE Men's Épée World Cups.

Medal Record

Olympic Games

World Championship

European Championship

Grand Prix

World Cups

References

External links
Paolo Pizzo profile from site Eurofencing.info
Paolo Pizzo profile from site Fédération Internationale d'Escrime

1983 births
Living people
Sportspeople from Catania
Italian male épée fencers
Fencers at the 2012 Summer Olympics
Fencers at the 2016 Summer Olympics
Olympic fencers of Italy
Fencers of Centro Sportivo Aeronautica Militare
Olympic silver medalists for Italy
Olympic medalists in fencing
Medalists at the 2016 Summer Olympics
Universiade medalists in fencing
Universiade silver medalists for Italy
Medalists at the 2009 Summer Universiade